Bulaklı is a village in the Yüksekova District of Hakkâri Province in Turkey. The village is populated by Kurds of Doski and Oramar tribes and had a population of 212 in 2022.

History 
The village of Bulaklı was previously Nestorian until Sayfo and was bought from the central government by Kurds from different tribal backgrounds creating a mixed tribally-composed village. The village was populated by 13 Assyrian families in 1850 and 17 families in 1877.

Population 
Population history of the village from 2000 to 2022:

References 

Villages in Yüksekova District
Kurdish settlements in Hakkâri Province
Historic Assyrian communities in Turkey